is a Japanese biathlete. He competed in the 20 km individual event at the 1972 Winter Olympics.

References

1944 births
Living people
Japanese male biathletes
Olympic biathletes of Japan
Biathletes at the 1972 Winter Olympics
Sportspeople from Akita Prefecture